Earl Maynard (born November 28, 1935) is a bodybuilder and professional wrestler as well as a film actor, producer and director from Barbados.

Career

Bodybuilding
Maynard won the 1964 Universe - Pro - NABBA bodybuilding competition - part of the Universe Championships, the 1965 Universe - IFBB - now the World Amateur Bodybuilding Championships and the 1978 Masters Mr. America - AAU contest. He was also the winner of Mr. Europe 1959 and Mr. England 1960 early in his career.

Professional wrestling
Maynard started wrestling while he was in the Royal Air Force stationed on Cyprus. The sports facilities were very limited, so the implements for his weightlifting and conditioning had to be improvised with what materials he could find. While He was on Cyprus, a British wrestling promoter, who was there on vacation, spotted him and liked what he saw. Maynard became a professional wrestler in 1960. It was wrestling promoter Gus Karras who eventually brought Earl to the United States to continue his wrestling career there.

By the late, 1960s, he was working in Pacific Northwest Wrestling, New York's WWWF and Canada's Stampede Wrestling. He was National Wrestling Alliance (NWA)'s America's Tag Team Champion twice (with Rocky Johnson in 1970 as well as with his longtime partner Dory Dixon in 1972).

He went to wrestle in Mexico for EMLL Consejo Mundial de Lucha Libre in 1971, Japan for International Wrestling Association of Japan from 1971 to 1972 and New Japan Pro-Wrestling in 1973. He would finished his career in San Francisco until he retired in 1978.

All of his bodybuilding achievements were accomplished while he continued to wrestle professionally. He eventually became known in the wrestling circles as "Mr. Universe" because of being a two-time winner of that most prestigious of bodybuilding titles.

Acting
He made over 20 appearances as an actor  in films. These include such films as Melinda (1972), Black Belt Jones (1974), Truck Turner (1974), Mandingo (1975), Swashbuckler (1976), The Deep (1977), Circle of Iron (1978), The Nude Bomb (1980), The Big Brawl (1980) and The Sword and the Sorcerer (1982).

Personal life
At the age of 17, Earl was 5’ 10” tall and weighed only 130 pounds. Maynard left the island when he was 18 and moved to England where he completed his education. He earned a degree of M.S.F. in Physiotherapy in London.

After retiring, Maynard returned to Barbados. He began to direct his own films and work in real estate.

Partial filmography
Melinda (1972) - Karate Group
Black Belt Jones (1974) - Junebug
Truck Turner (1974) - Panama
Uptown Saturday Night (1974) - Waldorf bartender (uncredited)
Mandingo (1975) - Babouin
Swashbuckler (1976) - Bath Attendant
The Deep (1977) - Ronald
Circle of Iron (1978) - Black Giant
The Nude Bomb (1980) - Jamaican Delegate
The Big Brawl (1980) - Buster Mountie
The Sword and the Sorcerer (1982) - Morgan (final film role)

Championships and accomplishments
NWA All-Star Wrestling
NWA Canadian Tag Team Championship (Vancouver version) (1 time) - with Dean Higuchi
NWA Hollywood Wrestling
NWA "Beat the Champ" Television Championship (2 times)
NWA Americas Tag Team Championship (3 times) – with Rocky Johnson (1), Frankie Laine (1) and Dory Dixon (1)

Bodybuilding contest history
 1958
 Mr. Universe - NABBA, Tall, 1st
 1959
Universe - IFBB, Most Muscular, 1st
Mr Universe - NABBA, Tall, 1st
 1961
Universe - Pro - NABBA, Tall, 2nd
 1963
Universe - Pro - NABBA, Tall, 3rd
 1964
Universe - Pro - NABBA, Tall, 1st
Universe - Pro - NABBA, Overall Winner
 1965
Mr. Olympia - IFBB, 3rd
Universe - IFBB, Tall, 1st
Universe - IFBB, Overall Winner
 1977
Masters Mr America - AAU, Tall, 1st
World Cup Pro Universe - PBBA, Masters, 3rd
 1978
Masters Mr America - AAU, Tall, 1st
Masters Mr America - AAU, Overall Winner

See also
 List of male professional bodybuilders
 List of female professional bodybuilders

References

External links
 

1935 births
Barbadian professional wrestlers
Male bodybuilders
Living people
Barbadian male film actors
20th-century male actors
People associated with physical culture
Stampede Wrestling alumni
20th-century professional wrestlers
NWA "Beat the Champ" Television Champions
NWA Americas Tag Team Champions